Seghizzi is an Italian surname. Notable people with the surname include:

Andrea Seghizzi, Italian Baroque painter
Cecilia Seghizzi (1908–2019), Italian composer
Michelangelo Seghizzi (1565–1625), Italian Roman Catholic bishop

Italian-language surnames